Facing the Music is a 1933 British musical comedy film directed by Harry Hughes and starring Stanley Lupino, Jose Collins and Nancy Burne. It is also known by the alternative title Jewel Song.

Production
The film was made at Elstree Studios by British International Pictures. It was one of a series of films made by the company featuring the popular stage entertainer Stanley Lupino. The film's art direction was by David Rawnsley.

Plot
In order to promote his client a publicist organises a fake robbery of her jewels, but things soon begin to unravel.

Cast
 Stanley Lupino as Jack Foley
 Nancy Burne as Nina Carson
 Jose Collins as Calvini
Nancy Brown as Rivers
 Doris Woodall as D'Ava
 Lester Matthews as - Becker
 Dennis Hoey as Capradossi
 Morris Harvey as De Breen
 Hal Gordon as Sim

Critical reception
TV Guide noted "a stiff opera-oriented production using Faust as a backdrop"; while britishfilmclassics.wordpress.com applauded "a highly entertaining performance by music hall star Stanley Lupino, who comes up with endless visual gags and one-liners."

References

Bibliography
Wood, Linda. British Films, 1927–1939. British Film Institute, 1986.

External links

1933 films
British musical comedy films
Films shot at British International Pictures Studios
1933 musical comedy films
Films directed by Harry Hughes
Films set in London
British black-and-white films
1930s English-language films
1930s British films